The GAZ-64 was a 4x4 vehicle made by GAZ (Gorkovsky Avtomobilny Zavod, translated as Gorky Automobile Plant, which originally was a cooperation between Ford and the Soviet Union), succeeding the earlier GAZ-61. Its design was led by Vitaliy Grachev. The design process was exceptionally quick, taking only a few weeks.

Design 

It was produced using existing commercially available parts.

Development 

The GAZ-64 was developed from a requirement developed during the 1939-1940 war between the Soviet Union and Finland. Although it appears outwardly similar to the American Bantam / Willys jeep, it was developed using parts already commercially available in the Soviet Union, and built in a plant that was originally set up with Ford.

It was designed to replace the earlier GAZ-61, which was totally reconstructed in a very short period (3 February – 25 March 1941) under the leadership of Vitaly Grachev to create a 4×4 jeep, which was named the GAZ-64. During WWII, it was succeeded by the more successful GAZ-67 and GAZ-67B. The GAZ-64 and GAZ-67 formed the basis for the BA-64 armoured cars.

Production 
646 GAZ-64s were made between March 1941 and summer 1942 by the GAZ or Gorkovsky Avtomobilny Zavod company. The name translates as the Gorky automobile plant, and the factory was originally a cooperation between the company Ford and the Soviet Union.

Due to the availability of American made jeeps provided by the American Lend-Lease program, the majority of wartime production of the GAZ-64 was dedicated to the BA-64 armored cars. Due to GAZ-64 (and GAZ-67(B) from 1943/1944) production being tied to BA-64 production, only around 2,500 regular units were produced during the war. Post-war production increased greatly, and more than 90,000 GAZ-67Bs were produced by the time production ended in 1953.

References

Citations

Bibliography 
 Pročko, Evgenij (2005). GAZ-64/67, GAZ-61/AR-NATI (4x4). Militaria. 
 Thompson, Andy (2008) Cars of the Soviet Union: The Definitive History. Haynes Publishing.

External links 

 Ad for a 1/72 model of the GAZ-64 armored car 
 Military Factory article

GAZ Group vehicles
World War II vehicles of the Soviet Union
Military light utility vehicles